"You & I" is a song from Graham Coxon's sixth studio album, Love Travels at Illegal Speeds. It was released 8 May 2006 as the second single from that album, charting at #39 in the UK Singles Chart (see 2006 in British music). The b-side for the 7" version of the single is a cover of The Jam song "See Saw" that backed "The Eton Rifles" single in late 1979. The b-side for both CD versions of the single, "Click Click Click", was originally available on the Japanese pressing of the album.

Track listings
Promo CD CDRDJ6691, released in early April 2006
"You & I" - 3:43
7" R6691
"You & I" - 3:43
"See Saw" (cover of The Jam song)
CD CDR6691
"You & I" - 3:43
"Click Click Click" - 2:54
Maxi-CD CDRS6691
"You & I" - 3:43
"Light Up Your Candles" - 3:29
"Click Click Click" - 2:54
"You & I" (video)

References

External links
TheMusicZine review 
musicOMH.com | single review

2006 singles
Graham Coxon songs
Song recordings produced by Stephen Street
2006 songs
Songs written by Graham Coxon
Parlophone singles